Myeloid-associated differentiation marker is a protein that in humans is encoded by the MYADM gene.

References

Further reading